Balendra Shah, popularly known as Balen Shah or simply Balen, is a Nepalese rapper, structural engineer and politician. He is currently serving as the 15th mayor of Kathmandu, the capital of Nepal. 

Shah has been a popular figure in Nepalese hip-hop since the early 2010s. Shah announced his candidacy as an independent and was elected at the 2022 local election, defeating Nepali Congress candidate Sirjana Singh and CPN (UML) candidate Keshav Sthapit. He is the first independent candidate to be elected as the mayor of Kathmandu.

Early life and education 
Shah was born on 27 April 1990 in Naradevi, Kathmandu. He is the youngest son of Ram Narayan Shah, an Ayurvedic practitioner, and his wife Dhruvadevi Shah. His parents moved to Kathmandu from Mahottari after his father was posted to Naradevi Ayurvedic Hospital. His paternal ancestral home is in Mahottari's Ekdara Rural Municipality, while his mother's family lives in Dhanusha. 

Shah attended V.S. Niketan Higher Secondary School for his 10+2 studies. He received a bachelor's degree (BE) in civil engineering from Himalayan Whitehouse International College. He also received a master's degree (MTech) in structural engineering from Visvesvaraya Technological University (VTU) in Karnataka, India.

Music career 
From an early age, Shah was interested in music and poetry. He released his first single, Sadak Balak, which he wrote while in the ninth grade, in 2012. He rose to prominence among Nephop fans in 2013 after his appearance on the YouTube battle rap series Raw Barz.

Political career 
Shah was involved in the "We For Constitution" movement before the promulgation of the Constitution of Nepal in 2015. He had also expressed interest in running for Kathmandu's mayorship in the 2017 local elections but later backed down.

2022 Kathmandu mayoral election 

Balen Shah had been mulling over his plans for candidacy since 2019 and on 17 December 2021 announced that he would be running for the mayoral race as an independent candidate through his Facebook Page. His campaign focused on waste management, road traffic control, public service delivery, anti-corruption, and preservation of cultural heritage of the city.

Shah was elected on 26 May 2022, winning 38.6% of the votes cast. He defeated Nepali Congress candidate Sirjana Shrestha and former mayor and CPN (UML) candidate Keshav Sthapit by a margin of over 23,000 votes.

Shah was sworn in as mayor on 30 May 2022 and administered the oath of office to other members of the municipal assembly elected at the elections.

Controversies 
Shah has been criticized over the profane and misogynistic elements of his rap lyrics. In early July 2022, he attracted controversy over the use of a sacred crown in Nephopko Shreepech, a hip-hop reality TV show in which he served as a judge.

Personal life 
Shah is married to Sabina Kafle, a public health professional. He lives with his family in Gairigaun, Tinkune.

Electoral history

2022 Kathmandu local election

References

External links

1990  births
Living people
Nepalese politicians
Nepalese hip hop singers
21st-century Nepalese male singers
People from Kathmandu
Male rappers
Independent politicians
Mayors of Kathmandu
Independent politicians in Nepal